Sam Cooper Boulevard is an urban highway in Memphis, Tennessee, United States. The more recent western segment of the road follows a parkway design, while the older eastern portion, which was proposed and constructed as a segment of Interstate 40 (I-40), is built as a freeway, without at-grade intersections and traffic lights. The western terminus of Sam Cooper Boulevard is at East Parkway North. At the western termination point of the road there is a short concurrency of East Parkway North with U.S. Route 64 (US 64), US 70, and US 79.

The road was originally planned in the 1950s. It was proposed as a segment of I-40 that would intersect the center of Memphis and continue west to Arkansas. The proposed route would have cut through Overton Park, an old forest public park in Memphis. Following a United States Supreme Court decision in 1971 the route was revised, I-40 was routed around Memphis in the north and plans of routing an Interstate highway through the city were abandoned. Ownership of the completed segments of the highway was transferred to the City of Memphis. As a road that is owned and maintained by the City of Memphis, no route number is assigned to Sam Cooper Boulevard.

History

Proposed route

In the 1950s, I-240 was planned as a complete loop around Memphis, consisting of a southern leg and a northern leg. I-40 was proposed to be routed through the center of the City of Memphis and to continue west into Arkansas over the Hernando de Soto Bridge, which was opened in 1973 and carries the traffic on modern I-40 over the Mississippi River. The I-240 loop was planned to route traffic not destined for Memphis around the city and to improve the flow of increasing traffic. The proposed I-240 loop would connect westbound and eastbound traffic to I-40 and southbound and northbound traffic to I-55.

What is now known as Sam Cooper Boulevard was planned as a segment of I-40, intersecting Memphis and distributing eastbound and westbound traffic with a destination in Memphis within the city. After a U.S. Supreme Court ruling stopped the plans to complete the section of I-40 cutting through Memphis in 1971, I-40 was re-routed. The routing of modern I-40 coincides with the proposed routing of the northern leg of I-240. Instead of the proposed I-240 loop around Memphis, the modern routing designates I-240 as the southern leg of the loop and I-40 as the northern leg of the loop.

From the west to the east, the proposed routing of Sam Cooper Boulevard coincides with the route of modern I-40 from the Hernando de Soto Bridge in downtown Memphis to the modern I-40/I-240 interchange west of North Bellevue Boulevard in midtown Memphis. East of the I-40/I-240 interchange, the proposed route of Sam Cooper Boulevard would have been routed almost due east for circa , parallel to and south of Overton Park Avenue and north of Peach Avenue until it reached Evergreen Street. East Parkway North also overlaps State Route 277.

Namesake
In 1968, the road was named after Sam Cooper, a Memphis businessman and longtime president of the Humko Corporation, a refinery of vegetable oils. He also was the vice president of the Federal Reserve Bank of Memphis. Cooper used his wealth to support St. Jude Children's Research Hospital and the University of Tennessee Medical School.

Citizen protests

In 1971, the United States Supreme Court in the case of Citizens to Preserve Overton Park v. Volpe stopped an extension of I-40 through Overton Park. Sam Cooper Boulevard was originally planned as an extension of I-40 to intersect the City of Memphis. The proposed route was completed as proposed east of North Highland Street and west of I-240 in Berclair, in the northeastern quadrant of Memphis. The portion of Sam Cooper Boulevard west of North Highland Street was never built as planned.

The unbuilt portion west of East Parkway North was not completed because it was proposed to go through Overton Park, the Memphis Zoo, and several historic neighborhoods of Memphis. Citizens residing in the neighborhoods of midtown Memphis along the route of the proposed highway were able to stop the route cutting through the old forest of Overton Park in the lawsuit.

Once the case was decided by the United States Supreme Court, the ownership of the completed segments of Sam Cooper Boulevard was given to the City of Memphis. Instead of following the planned route cutting through the center of Memphis, I-40 was routed around Memphis in the north. The new routing of I-40 to the north of Memphis follows the proposed northern leg of the I-240 loop.

Construction of the route segment of Sam Cooper Boulevard west of North Highland Street and east of East Parkway North began in 2001 and was completed in 2003. The construction did not follow the originally proposed freeway design for the road but implemented a parkway design with at-grade intersections, a raised median, traffic lights and sidewalks for pedestrians.

21st century

Extension to East Parkway

In 2001, the City of Memphis began construction on an extension of Sam Cooper Boulevard west of the North Highland Street exit. The route coinciding with Broad Avenue had several intersections with traffic signals and two major railroad crossings, creating traffic congestion at peak times. Several of the intersections were eliminated, a viaduct was constructed to avoid the railroad crossings and the route was extended to East Parkway North.

The original route east of North Highland Street, was designed as a six-lane freeway without intersections, traffic signals and without sidewalks for pedestrians, allowing only motorized traffic on the road. The extension of Sam Cooper Boulevard west of the North Highland Street exit was constructed as a six-lane controlled-access parkway. The median is raised and there are at-grade intersections present equipped with traffic signals and pedestrian crossings. The segment of Sam Cooper Boulevard west of North Highland Street and east of East Parkway North was completed in 2003.

Random shootings at cars
In 2004, it was reported by local newsmedia that several cars driving on Sam Cooper Boulevard had been shot at randomly in the section west of Tillman Street and east of North Hollywood Street in the Binghampton neighborhood. The Memphis Police Department (MPD) reported 13 shootings between August and October of that year. A spokesman for the MPD stated that only vehicle damage had occurred and that no persons were hurt in the shootings. Police recovered a 9 mm bullet from the front door of one vehicle. A special police task force was assigned to the case. It is not known if the shooter was caught.

Revitalization attempts

In 2006, citizens from the Binghampton neighborhood of Memphis voiced concerns about negative effects that the completion of the western portion of Sam Cooper Boulevard has had on the community. Claims were made that construction of the road between North Highland Street and East Parkway North cut the Binghampton area in half by creating "high-speed traffic" and "confusing traffic patterns". It was mentioned that the routing of Sam Cooper Boulevard to the south of Broad Avenue had "effectively made" the circa  stretch of Broad Avenue a "ghost town", creating vacant lots in the partly industrial area and an unsafe neighborhood.

The Memphis Flyer cites Robert Montague, executive director of the Binghampton Development Corporation: "When they built Sam Cooper, this area really got buried". Citizens suggested changes in the zoning and a re-design of the Broad Avenue area north of Sam Cooper Boulevard and south of Summer Avenue to re-vitalize that part of the neighborhood and attract business and residents. The following year, trees and shrubs were planted alongside Sam Cooper Boulevard and in the median west of North Highland Street. A few decorative flowerbeds were also installed in the median of the road to enhance the parkway design of the road.

Exit list

Proposed exits

Sam Cooper Boulevard is owned and maintained by the City of Memphis. No route number is assigned to Sam Cooper Boulevard and it is not a designated business route for Interstate traffic headed for Memphis. The exit numbering system on Sam Cooper Boulevard has not been changed since the route was planned. The exits are still numbered as if I-40 ran along Sam Cooper Boulevard as it was proposed straight through Memphis to connect to Arkansas over the Hernando de Soto Bridge. In fact, overhead gantry signs still told westbound motorists that they were heading towards Little Rock until the lettering was removed from the signs in March 2016.

The exits for I-40 along the proposed route segment through the center of Memphis, west of East Parkway North, that was never completed were planned in downtown Memphis (planned as exit 1), at Danny Thomas Boulevard (planned as exit 2), west of North Bellevue Boulevard as an interchange with modern-day I-240 (planned as exit 3) and at Stonewall Street in the Evergreen District of midtown Memphis (planned as exit 4). I-40 exits were proposed at East Parkway North (planned as exit 5) and Tillman Street (planned as exit 6).

The planned exit 1 along Sam Cooper Boulevard exists as exit 1 and exit 1A of modern-day I-40 in downtown Memphis just south of the Pyramid Arena. Exit 1 serves traffic to and from North Riverside Drive and Front Street; at exit 1A westbound traffic exits to North 2nd Street and eastbound traffic enters I-40 from North 3rd Street. Planned exit 2 coincides with modern exits 1B–D on I-40 at Danny Thomas Boulevard. Planned exit 3 exists as exit 1E on modern I-40 at the I-40/I-240 interchange west of North Bellevue Boulevard in the Medical district of Memphis. Planned exit 4 at Stonewall Street was never constructed. Planned exit 5 is an at-grade intersection with traffic signals at the western terminus of Sam Cooper Boulevard at East Parkway North, and planned exit 6 is an at-grade intersection with traffic lights at Tillman Street. Exits 7–9 and Exits 10A and 10B were constructed as proposed.

Existing exits

The following table lists the existing exits and intersections of Sam Cooper Boulevard as of 2017 from west to east.

Points of interest

Points of interest along Sam Cooper Boulevard (west to east).

 Overton Park at the western terminus
 Wolf River at the eastern terminus

References

External links

 TDOT smartway Information System
 TDOT smartway traffic camera at Sam Cooper Boulevard and Perkins Street
 TDOT smartway traffic camera at Sam Cooper Boulevard and Graham Street
 TDOT smartway traffic camera at Sam Cooper Boulevard and High Point Terrace
 TDOT smartway traffic camera at Sam Cooper Boulevard and Highland Street

Transportation in Memphis, Tennessee
Freeways in Tennessee
Interstate 40
Transportation in Shelby County, Tennessee